James Brown Lord (26 April 1859 — 1 June 1902) was an American architect, working in a Beaux-Arts idiom, with a practice in New York City. His Appellate Court House was his most prominent commission, noted at the time of his premature death, at the age of forty-three. He designed one of the first of the Carnegie libraries, the Yorkville Branch of the New York Public Library, at 222 East 79th Street (illustration).

Biography
Lord was born in New York, into a distinguished family, the son of James Couper Lord and grandson of Daniel Lord, a prominent lawyer in New York. His mother was a daughter of James Brown, founder of the firm that became Brown Brothers Harriman. He graduated from Princeton University in 1879 and apprenticed in the architectural office of William A. Potter. He was a member of the Tuxedo Club and designed many of the buildings at Tuxedo Park, New York.

He married Mary Townsend Nicoll, of a distinguished New York family and was a member of the Metropolitan Club, the Union League, the Players Club, the Racquet Club and professionally of the American Institute of Architects and the National Academy of Design, where he was a Fellow.  He is buried in Green-Wood Cemetery, Brooklyn.

Selected commissions 
His early commissions, from 1883, were for residences in New York; Yonkers, Roslyn, Long Island; Tuxedo Park, New York; and Bar Harbor, Maine.
King Model Houses, West 138 to West 139 Streets, between 7th and 8th Avenues. 1890. Conjointly with Stanford White and Bruce Price.
Delmonico's, 56 Beaver Street (1890), and Delmonico's Fifth Avenue (1896, demolished).
Appellate Court, Madison Square, New York. 1900.
Society of New York Hospital for the Insane (Bloomingdale Asylum), White Plains, New York. 1894
New York Infant Asylum, Amsterdam Avenue and West 61st Street,  New York (1901, demolished)
Brookside Cottage, Tuxedo Park, New York (1892)
St. Mary's-in-Tuxedo Episcopal Church Parish House, Tuxedo Park, New York (1901)

See also
 Statue of Chester A. Arthur

Notes

External links 
Green-Wood Cemetery Burial Search

1859 births
19th-century American architects
1902 deaths
Burials at Green-Wood Cemetery